Jerry Levine (born March 12, 1957) is an American actor and director of television and theatre. As an actor, he is best known for his roles as Joe on Will & Grace, Stiles in the 1985 feature film Teen Wolf and Jamie in the 1988 movie Casual Sex?.

Life and career
Levine graduated from Boston University with a Bachelor of Fine Arts degree.

His career started as an actor on the television series Charles in Charge in 1984, before moving into films as well, with his debut in 1985's Teen Wolf, alongside Michael J. Fox. He starred in the ensemble television drama The Bronx Zoo, which premiered as a mid-season replacement on NBC in 1987 and ran for two seasons. Other films include Iron Eagle (1986), K-9 (1989) and Oliver Stone's Vietnam War feature Born on the Fourth of July (1989) starring Tom Cruise.

Levine later found acting roles restricted to television. He starred in the 1990–91 sitcom, Going Places with Alan Ruck and Heather Locklear. He appeared in numerous series including Boy Meets World, Chicago Hope, Seinfeld, Monk and Will & Grace.

In 1994, Levine produced and directed a Met Theater stage production of the one-act play Sticks & Stones, the first produced work by screenwriters Drew McWeeny and Scott Swan. He also directed a number of other stage productions on Broadway.

In 1999, Levine started television directing, with five episodes of Boy Meets World and an episode of Chicago Hope. Both of these series ended in 2000. He then went on to direct twelve episodes of Monk, from 2002 to 2009. He also directed episodes of The Twilight Zone, The District, Joan of Arcadia, Jonas, Life Unexpected, Raising Hope, Ringer, 90210, Everybody Hates Chris, "Hawaii Five-0" and It's Always Sunny in Philadelphia.

References

External links

1957 births
Living people
20th-century American male actors
21st-century American male actors
American male film actors
American male television actors
American television directors
American theatre directors
Boston University College of Fine Arts alumni
Jewish American male actors
Male actors from New Jersey
People from New Brunswick, New Jersey
21st-century American Jews